This is a list of Water Ski European Championships champions Under-21.

See also
 Water skiing
 Masters Tournament (water ski)
 World water skiing champions
 List of Water Skiing European Champions
 List of Water Skiing Under-17 European Champions

References

External links
International Waterski and Wakeboard Federation
E&A LIST OF CHAMPIONS - U21 Championships
Water Ski European Championships
Water skiers